Víctor Guillermo Álvarez Delgado (born 14 March 1993) is a Spanish professional footballer. Mainly a left-back, he can also play as a left winger.

Club career

Espanyol
Born in Barcelona, Catalonia, Álvarez made his senior debut at only 17, competing with RCD Espanyol's reserves in the fourth division. On 6 March 2011, he made his first-team – and La Liga – debut, replacing fellow youth graduate David García for the last two minutes of a 1–0 away loss to Levante UD.

On 25 March 2013, Álvarez signed a new four-year deal with the Pericos, being also definitely promoted to the main squad. However, he underwent surgery in late May due to a cardiovascular disease, only returning to the fields six months later in the 4–1 away win against Rayo Vallecano.

Álvarez scored his first competitive goal for Espanyol on 15 January 2014, helping to a 4–2 home victory over AD Alcorcón in the round of 16 of the Copa del Rey. His first in the league came on 22 September 2015, in a 1–0 defeat of Valencia CF also at the Estadi Cornellà-El Prat.

Arsenal Tula
On 20 July 2017, Álvarez joined Russian Premier League club FC Arsenal Tula on a two-year contract. He scored his first goal on 11 August 2019, in a 1–0 home win over FC Ufa. 

Álvarez left on 31 July 2020.

Pafos
On 28 January 2021, Pafos FC announced the signing of Álvarez.

Career statistics

References

External links
Espanyol official profile

1993 births
Living people
Spanish footballers
Footballers from Barcelona
Association football defenders
Association football wingers
La Liga players
Segunda División B players
Tercera División players
RCD Espanyol B footballers
RCD Espanyol footballers
Russian Premier League players
FC Arsenal Tula players
Cypriot First Division players
Pafos FC players
Spain youth international footballers
Catalonia international footballers
Spanish expatriate footballers
Expatriate footballers in Russia
Expatriate footballers in Cyprus
Spanish expatriate sportspeople in Russia
Spanish expatriate sportspeople in Cyprus